Ronaldo Laitonjam is an Indian track cyclist, who competes in sprinting events.

Career 
He became the first Indian to win a medal at the Asian Cycling Championships. He has won three medals (1 silver and 2 bronze).

He has competed at the 2022 Commonwealth Games in the sprint, team sprint and 1 km time trial. He also competed at the 2021 and 2022 UCI Track Cycling World Championships. He finished second overall in the kilometer at the 2021 UCI Track Cycling Nations Cup.

References

External links

2002 births
Living people
Indian male cyclists
Indian track cyclists
People from Imphal
Sportspeople from Manipur
Cyclists at the 2022 Commonwealth Games
Commonwealth Games competitors for India
UCI Track Cycling World Champions (men)